Benzo[e]pyrene is a polycyclic aromatic hydrocarbon with the chemical formula C20H12. It is listed as a Group 3 carcinogen by the IARC.

See also
 Benzopyrene
 Benzo[a]pyrene
 Benzene
 Pyrene, a four-ring analogue

References

Polycyclic aromatic hydrocarbons
IARC Group 3 carcinogens